Ko is a 2011 Indian Tamil-language political action thriller film directed by K. V. Anand, and written by Anand and the duo Suresh and Balakrishnan. The film stars Jiiva, Ajmal, Karthika (in her major Tamil debut), and Piaa Bajpai in lead roles, while Prakash Raj and Kota Srinivasa Rao appear in supporting roles.
The film follows Ashwin (Jiiva), a photojournalist working for Dina Anjal who covers the Tamil Nadu State Election. The core plot of the movie was reported to be based on the 2009 movie State of Play.

The film features music composed by Harris Jayaraj, with cinematography handled by Richard M. Nathan and editing done by Anthony. The film was released on 22 April 2011 to mostly positive reviews, and became a commercial success. It was dubbed in Telugu as Rangam, and released on the same date, which also becoming a success at the box-office.

The film won two Filmfare Awards South, three Vijay Awards, two SIIMA Awards, and four Tamil Nadu State Film Awards. Based on an online poll conducted by The Times of India, it won the Chennai Times Best Film Award for 2011. The film was remade in Bengali as Kanamachi (2013). A standalone sequel to the film titled as Ko 2 was released in 2016.

Plot
Ashwin Kumar is a photojournalist working for the private newspaper Dina Anjal. He witnesses Naxalites robbing a local bank. He chases them and manages to click photos of the robbers. When he tries to escape, he is stopped by a woman Renuka 'Renu', who assumes he is the culprit and helps the robbers take his camera. However, he is able to secure the camera's memory card. The police catch Ashwin, and to prove that he is a press photographer, he shows the photos to them, who identify everyone except the gang leader (whose face is covered by a mask). At his office, he again meets Renu, who has newly joined as an article editor. He slowly falls in love with Renu. Saraswathi 'Saro' also works in his office and has feelings for Ashwin, who does not reciprocate.

Settled in her new job, Renu writes a cover story about a politician Aalavandhan, describing his attempt to marry a minor. Enraged by this, Aalavandhan barges into the newspaper office and shouts at Renu. The audio recording of her interview disappears (courtesy of Aalavandhan), and she is fired from her job for falsified reporting. Ashwin later risks his life to capture the pictures of Aalavandhan, who actually engages in child marriage in a temple at midnight. Later the story with the photos is printed in their newspaper, and this makes Renu reciprocate Ashwin's love. Saro is initially jealous of the love between Ashwin and Renu but later accepts it and gets over Ashwin. Meanwhile, Vasanthan Perumal, an engineer and recent graduate, strives hard to enter politics by contesting in the upcoming election. He is contesting against more experienced politicians who capture the people by giving freebies and money.

Nobody cares about Vasanthan and his team of graduates, who promise a healthy government to people. Their party name is Siragugal (wings). Ashwin and Renu find out about Vasanthan's election campaign, and they and the entire Dina Anjal team extend their support to the campaign, covering it extensively, much to the chagrin of Aalavandhan and the CM Yogeswaran. One night, Vasanthan's party organizes an election campaign meeting. While photographing the event, Ashwin receives a text message from Saro that states there is a bomb underneath the stage where Vasanthan is speaking. Ashwin manages to save Vasanthan just before the bomb explodes. Later, Ashwin finds Saro fatally wounded near the blast site. Saro struggles to tell something to Ashwin and Renu before she dies. Ashwin, through a video clip recorded by another photographer, discovers that Saro was intentionally killed by someone. He later notices a resemblance between the leader of the bank robbery and this unknown killer, concluding that the Naxalite leader killed Saro.

A few days later, Renu notices that Vasanthan's photo in their newspaper was cut from a college class photo, where Ashwin is also present. It is revealed that Vasanthan is Ashwin's former college mate. Confronted by Renu, Ashwin tells her that he and Vasanthan studied in the same college and were best friends. He also tells her that he is happy for Vasanthan's success and is wholeheartedly supporting his election campaign. In the election, Vasanthan's party wins by a huge majority, and Vasanthan becomes the Chief Minister. He orders the release of 20 Naxals on Republic Day, citing humanity. Shocked on hearing this news, Ashwin rushes to the secretariat to meet Vasanthan. In Vasanthan's office, Ashwin notices that the Naxalite leader who killed Saro is there, talking with Vasanthan. Ashwin airs his grievances to Vasanthan, who ignores him. Ashwin follows the leader to his hideout.

At the same time, Vasanthan orders the Tamil Nadu Police (T.N.P) to go kill the Naxals at their hideout, and the commandos surround the perimeter of that place. Ashwin, already at the hideout, confronts the Naxalite leader Kadhir, and finds out from him that Vasanthan had made a deal with the Naxalites to help him win the election. They orchestrated events such as the burning of a hut and saving the woman in that hut (who was also a Naxalite) to win people's sympathy. In the same vein, they had planted a bomb on the stage where Vasanthan was speaking during his meeting. Saro had found out the truth about Vasanthan but was fatally assaulted by him so that she does not reveal his intentions to anyone. Ashwin realises that Saro had tried to warn him and Renu about Vasanthan's true character before dying and also that now Vasanthan is double-crossing the Naxalites and is planning to kill them as a show of achievement.

Ashwin records this confession using his mobile phone camera and sends it to Renu, who plans to publish this story in their newspaper. Vasanthan then arrives and kills Kadhir. He also tries to kill Ashwin. However, Ashwin triggers a land mine there, which explodes, killing Vasanthan, while Ashwin manages to escape. Vasanthan's party members arrive at the hideout on hearing the news that Vasanthan had died. Seeing their innocence, Ashwin forces Renu not to reveal the truth about Vasanthan because his party members would get into serious trouble and lose their seats just for supporting him. They did not know about Vasanthan's intentions and supported him, believing his false claims of a "healthy government". Renu publishes an article saying that Vasanthan had sacrificed his life fighting the Naxalites and died as a martyr. Ashwin and Renu submit their resignations to the editor, S. Krishnakumar 'Krish', for falsified reporting, but he rejects their resignations and tells them to cover the next CM.

Cast

Special appearances by cine-artists in the song "Aga Naga song"

Production

Casting
Initially the film was rumored to have Karthi in the lead. However, it was later officially announced that Silambarasan would play the lead in the film, but was later replaced by Jiiva. Actors Ajith and Suriya were also considered for the role. The lead female role was initially supposed to be enacted by Tamannaah, who was replaced by actress Karthika Nair. Piaa Bajpai and Ajmal Ameer in pivotal roles.

KV Anand approached Dravidian ideologue Suba Veerapandian ("Subavee") for casting him as Krish, but the latter declined the offer after showing some initial interest, resulting in Achyuth Kumar taking the role instead. Had Subavee accepted the offer, Ko would have been his second film as an actor, after Ilakkanam (2006).

Filming
The film was shot on location in Chennai, Harbin in China as well as in Western Norway at Trolltunga, Stalheim, Bergen and Prekestolen, becoming the first Tamil film to be shot in Norway and places of Bangalore near Nayandahalli under bridge.

The trailer of this film was played during the screening of Manmadan Ambu and got a favourable response.

Music

For the film's soundtrack and score, K. V. Anand, roped in composer Harris Jayaraj, who previously worked with the director on Ayan (2009). The composition of the songs took place in Macau. The  album features six tracks, with lyrics written by Pa. Vijay, Madhan Karky, Kabilan, Viveka, Vanamali, Sricharan, Emcee Jesz. On 5 November 2010, coinciding with Diwali, a short teaser was released which featured the song "Enamo Aedho" which received acclaim from critics and audience. Another song, "Aga Naga", featured special appearances by several Tamil film personalities, including composer Jayaraj (see under cast). The album was launched on 12 January 2011, at the Image Auditorium in Chennai,  with the presence of the film's cast and crew, and other celebrities, which was followed by a press meet the following day, at the Green Park Hotel in Chennai. The audio event was telecasted on Kalaignar TV on 26 January 2011, coinciding with Republic Day.

The soundtrack album for the Telugu version Rangam was released by Aditya Music on 9 March 2011.

Reception

The soundtrack received mixed reviews from critics. C. Karthik from Behindwoods.com gave 2.5 out of 5 writing, "Overall, Harris has tried to re-create the Ayan magic in KV Anand's latest and has achieved it to an extent [...] There are a couple of songs that give bragging rights to Harris but the others fail to scale the same height. Ko is worth having in your personal collection!" Pavithra Srinivasan of Rediff gave a 2 out of 5, citing that "aside from the sweetly melodious Ennamo Edho, the other numbers are all mish-mashed versions of his earlier hits." Indiaglitz said, "Ko's music is vivacious with different genres of romantic songs, hip hop and nevertheless even poetic." Milliblog reviewed "KV Anand may be a master storyteller, but his music sense continues to be strictly average; Harris doesn't help either." Music Aloud gave a rating of 7 out of 10, to the soundtrack and commented, "Barring the one gem in the form of Ennamo Yaedho, a middling score from Harris Jayaraj for Ko. Which is a huge letdown when compared to the score w he produced less than 2 months back."

Release

Theatrical
Ko was originally scheduled to release on 11 February 2011, the film was postponed due to the 2011 Cricket World Cup which was held in India, and as it ends on 2 April, the makers fixed the release to 14 April 2011, which was again postponed due to the 2011 Tamil Nadu Legislative Assembly Election, which was held at that time, and was finally slated to release on 22 April 2011. The film was opened in nearly 2230 theatres worldwide, making it Jiiva's biggest release ever. It was also released in multiplexes across metros like Delhi, Mumbai, Pune, Chandigarh, Lucknow and Vadodara with English subtitles to attract the non-Tamil audience.

Home media
The satellite rights of the film were secured by Kalaignar while Ayngaran International released the film on DVD and Blu-ray. The film was later dubbed and released in Hindi as The Real Leader on YouTube in 2018.

Reception

Critical response
The film opened to positive reviews. Behindwoods wrote "The director has aptly mixed intelligent and commercial cinema in Ko. The film making is nearly flawless and excels in places where he brings in slice of life incidents to invoke humor". The Hindu described the film as a "tale with a realistic twist" and praised Anand who "strikes gold with Ko. Blending the commercial with the realistic is a challenge, but K. V. Anand proves adept at it." Indiaglitz wrote "Anand deserves all accolades for rendering a brisk entertainer that is devoid of cliches. Racy all through, it is a movie that is worth a watch, if you are really not bothered about logic at certain places". The Times of India gave three and a half citing: "With Ko, director Anand gives notice of his immense talent once again, making a movie that is all set to lord over the box office this summer". Nowrunning wrote "Ko staggers throughout, pretending to take risks and after the first misstep; it's nothing but a free fall, all the way. The funny thing is the free fall isn't a smooth ride either. It hits every protruding rock". National Film Award-winning critic, Baradwaj Rangan wrote: "If someone wants to make a case for the abolishment of song and dance from our cinema, Ko would be Exhibit A." He also went on to state that Ko was "a series of big scenes with no transitions, no segues, no scenes that just stop to smell the scenery."

Box office
The film opened 95–100% occupancy on first day collected . In Chennai, it collected  in the opening weekend.

The Telugu version, Rangam collected  at the box office and also declared Blockbuster, with distributors organizing celebrations in Tirupati on its 100th day of theatrical run.

Accolades

Remakes
The film was remade in Bengali as Kanamachi (2013) by Raj Chakraborty. It stars Ankush Hazra, Srabanti and Abir Chatterjee.

Sequel

A standalone sequel to the film titled Ko 2 was announced by the producer Elred Kumar, which features a different cast and crew, starring Bobby Simha and Nikki Galrani, except Prakash Raj, who reprised his role from the original. The film was released in May 2016.

Legacy
The song "Ennamo Edho" inspired a 2014 film of same name starring Gautham Karthik and the Telugu version Enduko Emo inspired a 2018 film starring Nandu. Brahmanandam performed a parody of the song in Telugu film Naayak (2013). The song placement of "Venpaniye" was widely criticised, and KV Anand made a humor of it in his film Maattrraan (2012).

References

External links
 

2011 films
2010s Tamil-language films
2011 action thriller films
2010s political thriller films
Indian action thriller films
Indian political thriller films
Political action films
Tamil films remade in other languages
Films about journalists
Films about photojournalists
Films about the mass media in India
Films about Naxalism
Films shot in Andhra Pradesh
Films shot in Coimbatore
Films shot in Puducherry
Films shot in Norway
Films set in Chennai
Films shot in Madurai
Films shot in Tiruchirappalli
Films scored by Harris Jayaraj
Journalism adapted into films
Films with screenplays by Subha
Films directed by K. V. Anand